

References

Lists of Ohio politicians